The Tamil Nadu State Planning Commission is an institution in the Government of Tamil Nadu.

See also
 Planning Commission (India)
 Investment commission of India
 Five-Year Plans of India
 Ministry of Finance, Government of India
 Finance Commission of India

References

External links
Official Homepage

Economic planning in India
State agencies of Tamil Nadu
Year of establishment missing